Julie Dachez (born 5 February 1985) is a French social psychologist, lecturer and autism rights activist. She's the author of  Invisible Differences and Dans ta bulle! ('In your dreams!'). In 2016, she became the first openly autistic person to defend a thesis on the subject in France.

Biography 
Dachez studied at a business school and worked for four years in the private sector. In 2012 she was diagnosed with Asperger's syndrome at an Autism Resource Center. She then began working on autism by creating a blog, making videos on YouTube and embarked on a doctoral programme in social psychology on the subject. In 2016, she became the first openly autistic person to defend a thesis on this subject in France, Envisager l’autisme autrement: une approche psychosociale ('Seeing autism differently: a psychosocial approach').

Positions on autism 
Dachez sees autism as "a difference in functioning pathologised by a society obsessed with normality", which she sees from a social and non-medical point of view, mainly in terms of the stigmatisation and discrimination suffered by autistic people. She argues that she suffer more from other people's prejudices about autism and the inadequacy of social structures and its needs than from the fact that she is herself autistic. She believes that the specific behaviours of autistic people are related to coping strategies.

She describes autism in women as a "double sentence", due to the gender bias associated with the more subtle manifestations of autistic disorders in women and the fact that the diagnostic criteria for autism were developed from male diagnoses, leading to diagnostic errors in women. She also critics the lack of knowledge in France about autism, especially about Asperger syndrome in women.

Activities 
Dachez has published two books on the subject of autism. It received favorable reviews, as much for its didactical value as for its narrative and aesthetic treatment.

Her second book, Dans ta bulle!

She lectures on the subject of autism and campaigns, among other things, to overcome the prejudices associated with autists. In this context, she participated as a speaker at the World Autism Awareness Day in 2018. In 2019, she get involved again in this event, but this time as part of PEP 12 (Pupils in Public Education).

Bibliography 
 Julie Dachez (ill. Mademoiselle Caroline), Invisible Differences (French: La Différence invisible, The Invisible Difference), Paris, Delcourt, coll. « Mirages », 2016, 196 p. .
 Julie Dachez, Dans ta bulle ! (In your bubble !), Vanves, Marabout, 2018, 256 p. .

Publications 
 Julie Dachez, André N’Dobo et Oscar Navarro Carrascal, « Représentation sociale de l'autisme », Les Cahiers Internationaux de Psychologie Sociale, vol. 4, no 112, 2016, p. 477-500
 Julie Dachez, Andre Ndobo et Anaïs Ameline, « French Validation of the Multidimensional Attitude Scale Toward Persons with Disabilities (MAS) : The case of Attitudes Toward Autism and Their Moderating Factors », Journal of Autism and Developmental Disorders, vol. 45, no 8, août 2015, p. 2508–2518.

References 

Living people
Autism activists
French disability rights activists
People with Asperger syndrome
Academics with disabilities
21st-century French women writers
1985 births